Saghar is a village and union council, an administrative subdivision, of Talagang District in the Punjab Province of Pakistan, it is part of Talagang District.

References

Union councils of Chakwal District
Populated places in Chakwal District